Autranella is a genus of plant in family Sapotaceae described as a genus in 1917. It contains only one recognized species, Autranella congolensis (also known as mukulungu), native to west-central Africa (Nigeria, Cameroon, Gabon, Central African Republic, Republic of the Congo, Cabinda, Democratic Republic of the Congo).

The species is listed as critically endangered.

References

 
Monotypic Ericales genera
Flora of Africa
Critically endangered plants
Taxonomy articles created by Polbot
Sapotaceae genera
Taxa named by Auguste Chevalier
Taxa named by Émile Auguste Joseph De Wildeman